Cérès (Q190) was a  of the French Navy. The submarine was laid down at the Chantiers Worms shipyard in Rouen on 8 August 1936, launched on 9 December 1938, and commissioned 15 July 1939.

Following Operation Torch, she was scuttled by her crew at Oran on 9 November 1942, to prevent her from falling into the hands of the Allies. She was later salvaged by the Allies in early 1943, but not put back into commission, and was eventually struck on 18 February 1946.

See also

List of submarines of France

References

1938 ships
Ships built in France
World War II submarines of France